The Borlaug Award is an award recognition conferred by a fertilizer company, Coromandel International, for outstanding Indian scientists for their research and contributions in the field of agriculture and environment. The award was created in 1972 and named in honour of Nobel Laureate Norman E. Borlaug. It carries a cash prize of Rs 500,000, a gold medal, and a citation.

The award should not be confused with the IFA Norman Borlaug Award of the International Fertilizer Industry Association or the Borlaug Award for Field Research given by the World Food Prize Foundation.

Recipients
• 2020 : Kajal chakravarti
 2012: K.V. Prabhu and Ashok Kumar Singh
 2006: Rajendra Singh Paroda
 2005: Rattan Lal and Subramaniam Nagarajan
 2004: I. V. Subba Rao and Suman Sahai
 2000: Anil Agarwal
 1997: Azra Quraishi
 1995: Ebrahimali Abubacker Siddiq 
 1991: Amrita Patel
 1985: Virender Lal Chopra
 1983: Nanjappa Shamanna Subba Rao 
 1982: Hari Krishan Jain
 1979: Bishwajit Choudhury  and M. S. Swaminathan
 1977: J.S. Kanwar and Gurdev Khush
 1976: Chivakula Krishnamoorthy 
 1973: Jitendra P. Srivastava [Dr. J.P. Srivastava] and Dr. Manodutt Pathak
 1972: Dr. Atmaram Bhairav Joshi

See also

 List of agriculture awards
 List of prizes named after people

References

Indian awards
Indian science and technology awards
Awards established in 1972
Agriculture awards of India
1972 establishments in India